Emory West Dunahoo (born July 8, 1957) is an American politician. He has worked in the fields of logistics and poultry sales and has been elected to the Georgia House of Representatives. He is a Republican who represents an area close to Gainesville.

References

Republican Party members of the Georgia House of Representatives
Living people
People from Hall County, Georgia
21st-century American politicians
1957 births